Hafiz Wontah Konkoni (born 27 December 1999) is a Ghanaian professional footballer who plays as midfielder for Ghanaian Premier League side Bechem United. He previously had spells in Northern Cyprus playing for Merit Alsancak Yeşilova and Baf Ülkü Yurdu.

Early life 
Konkoni is a native of Wa in the Upper West Region of Ghana. He moved to the Northern Region and attended secondary school education in Bole, before later returning to his home region to enroll at Tumu College of Education, previously Tumu Teacher Training College. He is a trained teacher by profession.

Career

Early career 
Konkoni started his senior career with lower-tier side Amajande FC in Bole. He served as the captain of the side and helped the club to earn a promotion into the Ghana Division One league during his playing time with the club. His performances attracted deals from clubs with the division one and premier league. He eventually joined newly premier league promoted side Bolga Stars in 2017, whilst training as a teacher in Tumu.

Bolga Stars 
Konkoni joined Bolga Stars in 2017 after they had earned a promotion into the Ghana Premier League for the 2017 season. He played alongside Ibrahim Imoro within that period. He made his debut 4 March 2017, playing the full 90 minutes in a 2–0 loss to Tema Youth. Due to combining studies and football, travelling between the two region, he made 8 league appearances and scored 2 goals as the club were relegated to the division one league.

Bechem United 
In early 2018, Konkoni joined Ghana Premier League side Bechem United ahead of the 2018 Ghana Premier League season. In his debut season with the club, he scored 8 goals in 12 league  ending as the top scorer before the league cancelled due to the dissolution of the Ghana Football Association in June 2018, as a result of the Anas Number 12 Expose.

Merit Alsancak Yesilova 
In October 2018, Konkoni signed a two-year deal with Northern Cypriot side Merit Alsancak Yeşilova. During his first campaign with the club, he made five appearances scoring one and with four assists as his season was interrupted due to a series of injuries. He was later loaned out to Baf Ülkü Yurdu.

Return to Bechem United 
Ahead of the 2019–20 season, Konkoni returned to his former club and featured in 14 league matches, scored 2 goals and made 1 assists before the league was truncated due to the COVID-19 pandemic.

Personal life 
Konkoni married his long-time girlfriend in June 2019 at Suuriyiri mosque in the Northern Region. He is a devout Muslim.

References

External links 
 
 

Living people
1999 births
Ghanaian footballers
Bechem United F.C. players
Ghana Premier League players
Ghanaian Muslims
Association football forwards
People from Upper West Region